Cirrus Gallery and Cirrus Editions Limited Publishing and Printing is an art gallery, print workshop and publishing venue in Los Angeles, California. Cirrus Gallery, which houses Cirrus Editions, was founded by Jean Milant and opened in January 1970 in Hollywood, before moving to its permanent location in 1979 on Alameda Street in Downtown Los Angeles. Notable artists whose works were shown and printed with Cirrus Editions include Peter Alexander, John Baldessari, Vija Celmins, Judy Chicago, Judy Fiskin, Craig Kauffman, Allan McCollum, Ed Moses, Bruce Nauman, Ed Ruscha, Betye Saar, Alexis Smith, and Mary Weatherford.

Archives
In 1986 the Los Angeles County Museum of Art (LACMA) acquired the entire archive of artworks produced by Cirrus Editions, including etchings, lithographs, mixed media prints, screenprints, and woodcuts along with corresponding plates and woodblocks. The archive represented every single print that was editioned through Cirrus Editions. In 1995, LACMA presented 130 artworks from the archive in the exhibition titled "Made in L.A.: The Prints of Cirrus Editions" curated by Bruce Davis.

References

Publishing companies established in 1970
Companies based in Los Angeles
Art galleries established in 1970
1970 establishments in California